Ridings is the surname of the following people:
Dave Ridings (born 1970), English football midfielder
Freya Ridings (born 1994), English singer, songwriter, and multi-instrumentalist
Gordon Ridings (1907–1958), American college basketball player and coach
Holly Ridings (born 1973), American mechanical engineer and chief flight director at NASA
Ken Ridings (1920–1943), Australian cricketer
Phil Ridings (1917–1998), Australian cricketer, brother of Ken
Richard Ridings (born 1958), British actor
Stephen Ridings (born 1995), American baseball player
Tag Ridings (born 1974), American golfer

See also
Riding (surname)

English-language surnames